Toman (also known as Zdeněk Toman) is a 2018 Czech historical film by Ondřej Trojan. It focuses on Zdeněk Toman, who led Czechoslovak intelligence from 1945 to 1948. It premiered at Slavonice Film Festival on 2 August 2018.

Plot
The film follows the rise and fall of Zdeněk Toman, Head of Czechoslovak Intelligence from 1945 to 1948.

The film starts in April 1948 when Toman is interrogated by Inspector Putna. The film then moves to March 1945 when Toman was repatriation officer in Carpathian Ruthenia. He comes into conflict with NKVD officers who insist that nobody will be repatriated from Carpathian Ruthenia as it will become part of Soviet Union. Toman bribes NKVD officers and later meets Imrich Rosenberg. Rosenberg asks Toman to help repatriate Jews from Carpathian Ruthenia. Toman agrees to help for money. Toman later organises a meeting of the exiled Czechoslovak government in Košice. He meets Václav Nosek, who agrees to help him with his career. Nosek helps Toman to become part of Czechoslovak Intelligence, which is led by non-communist General Josef Bartík. Toman befriends a prominent Communist Rudolf Slánský, who tasks Toman to get finances for the Communist Party of Czechoslovakia. Toman uses his contacts in Great Britain to get the finances and also rises in prominence. He replaces Bartík as the Head of Intelligence. He also uses his influence to help Jewish refugees and to help establish Israel. Toman's finances help Communists to win 1946 election. He meets Klement Gottwald but also becomes an enemy of the Communist Clique represented by Bedřich Reicin, which has ties in the Soviet Union. Toman's support for Israel gets him into conflict with the Soviets. Toman is removed from his position during the 1948 coup d'état. Toman is arrested while his wife commits suicide. Toman manages to escape, and with the help of Jewish representatives he previously helped, he escapes to Bavaria where he surrenders to American soldiers.

Cast
 Jiří Macháček as Zdeněk Toman
 Kateřina Winterová as Pesla Tomanová
 Kristýna Boková as Milada Třískalová
 Stanislav Majer as Rudolf Slánský
 Marek Taclík as Bedřich Reicin
 Roman Luknár as Jan Masaryk
 Lukáš Latinák as Vlado Clementis
 Táňa Pauhofová as Aurélia Tomanová
 Lukáš Melník as František Kuracin
 Jaromír Dulava as Václav Nosek
 Jiří Dvořák as General Bártík
 Martin Finger as Adolf Püchler
 Aleš Procházka as Klement Gottwald
 Radek Holub as Karel Šváb
 Ondřej Malý as Aladar Berger
 Matěj Ruppert as Marian Kargul
 Jaroslav Plesl as Rosenberg
 Marián Mitaš as Karel Vaš
 Miroslav Táborský as Veselý
 Ady Hajdu as Zorin
 Václav Neužil as Bedřich Pokorný
 Pavel Liška as Evžen Zeman
 Lukáš Hlavica as JUDr. Horák
 Halka Třešňáková as Josefa Slánská
 Petr Vaněk as Gaynor Jacobson
 Jaroslav Kubera as Edvard Beneš

Production
Zdeňka Šimandlová received request for screenplay about Zdeněk Toman. She worked on it for 4 years even after the request was taken back. Šimandlová approached Ondřej Trojan with the screenplay in 2010. Trojan became fascinated by the character of Zdeněk Trojn and agreed to make film according to the screenplay. The screenplay was severely modified to make it more historically accurate. Martin Šmok was invited to the production as a history advise to assure historical accuracy of the film.

Trojan started to gather finances for the film. He planned to start filming in 2014 but negotiations with Czech Television took longer than expected. Trojan decided to start when the film had 70% of finances ensured.

Filming started on 4 April 2017. It took place in Brdy and later moved to Prague. Some parts were filmed at Barrandov Studios. Shooting finished on 30 October 2017. Director and producer Ondřej Trojan announced that the film is expected to have difficult post-production.

Release
Premiere was scheduled for 12 April 2018 but had to be moved to 4 October 2018 as a result of problematic post-production. The film eventually had a limited premiere for accredited audience at Slavonice Film Festival. It was distributed for Cinema on 4 October 2018.

Reception
The film premiered at Slavonice Film Festival. It received positive reactions and a long ovation from audience. František Fuka published his review on 26 September 2018. He was writing of the film but praised final part of the film. Mirka Spáčilová called Toman a talking Enciclopedia. The film received overall mixed to positive reviews from critics as it holds 66% at Kinobox.cz. The film was nominated for 13 Czech Lion Awards.

Accolades

References

External links
 
 
 Toman at CSFD.cz 
 Toman at cfn.cz 

2018 films
Czech historical thriller films
2010s Czech-language films
2010s historical thriller films
Films set in the 1940s
Slovak historical drama films
Czech Lion Awards winners (films)
Carpathian Ruthenia in fiction